François Zola (born Francesco Antonio Giuseppe Maria Zolla; 7 August 1796 – 27 March 1847) was an Italian-born French engineer. He built the Zola Dam, creating Lac Zola near Le Tholonet in Aix-en-Provence. 

Zola was an Italian engineer with some Greek ancestry, who was born in Venice in 1795; his mother was French. 

He lived in Paris with his wife Émilie Aubert when their son, the author Émile Zola, was born in 1840.
The family moved to Aix-en-Provence when Émile was three years old. François died four years later, in 1847.

References

1796 births
1847 deaths
Engineers from Venice
People from Aix-en-Provence
Italian emigrants to France
Italian people of Greek descent
French people of Greek descent